The 2013 Women's International Super Series Hockey 9's was the third and final edition of the women's field hockey tournament. The tournament was held at the Perth Hockey Stadium between 17–20 October 2013 in Perth, Australia. A total of four teams competed for the title.

The tournament was held alongside the men's competition. 

Australia won the tournament by defeating Argentina 3–0 in the final. Canada won the bronze medal by defeating Malaysia 3–1 in the third and fourth playoff.

Participating nations
A total of four teams competed for the title:

Competition rules
The International Super Series Hockey 9's has a unique set of rules varying from standard FIH regulations.

The main variations are as follows:
Matches are played with a maximum of 9 players on the field at any time for each team
Matches are played in 2 halves of 20 minutes
Goals are widened by 1 metre than regulation size

Results
All times are local time: (UTC+08:00).

Pool matches

Classification matches

Third and fourth place

Final

Statistics

Final standings

Goalscorers
5 Goals
 Madonna Blyth

4 Goals

 Agustina Albertario
 Ashleigh Nelson
 Georgie Parker

3 Goals

 Luciana Aymar
 Martina Cavallero
 Carla Rebecchi
 Casey Eastham

2 Goals

 Brooke Peris
 Thea Culley

1 Goal

 Gisele Juárez
 Delfina Merino
 Mariela Scarone
 Daniela Sruoga
 Jade Close
 Claire Messent
 Jayde Taylor
 Rachel Donohoe
 Stephanie Gardiner
 Danielle Hennig
 Abigail Raye
 Kristine Wishart
 Amanda Woodcroft
 Naida Abdul Rahman
 Siti Noor Amarina Ruhani
 Norazlin Sumantri

References

International women's field hockey competitions hosted by Australia
2013 in Australian women's field hockey
2013 in Canadian women's sports
2013 in Argentine women's sport
2013 in Malaysian women's sport
2013 in women's field hockey